Hillside Lodge is a historic cure cottage located at Saranac Lake in the town of Harrietstown, Franklin County, New York.  It was built about 1920 and is a single-family, one-story dwelling clad in cedar shingles and surmounted by a standing-seam hipped roof.  It has a two-story turret with solarium and a fieldstone chimney.  It features two cure porches and has Colonial Revival and Queen Anne style details.

It was listed on the National Register of Historic Places in 1992.

References

Houses on the National Register of Historic Places in New York (state)
Queen Anne architecture in New York (state)
Colonial Revival architecture in New York (state)
Houses completed in 1920
Houses in Franklin County, New York
National Register of Historic Places in Franklin County, New York